Penicillium madriti is an anamorph species of the genus of Penicillium which produces orsellinic acid.

References

Further reading 
 
 
 

madriti
Fungi described in 1961